Trophonopsis breviata is a species of sea snail, a marine gastropod mollusk in the family Muricidae, the murex snails or rock snails.

Description
The shell grows to a length of 12.5 mm.

Distribution
This species is found in the Mediterranean Sea off Greece and in the Black Sea.

References

External links
 

Trophonopsis
Gastropods described in 1882